The Serdang Komuter station is a KTM Komuter train station located in Serdang, Selangor, Malaysia.

The station serves KTM Komuter's Seremban Line and also previously KTM Intercity. It is located along the Besraya Expressway .

Around the station
 Mines Wellness City

Gallery

Connection with MRT Putrajaya Line
The nearby MRT Putrajaya line  Serdang Jaya station which is located 2km west is also connected to this Komunter station. However, the feeder bus route T565 from MRT station do not stop at this station, instead the bus will stop at Flat Taman Muhhibah which has a link bridge to Serdang Komuter station. Passengers from this Komuter station can either board the SmartSelangor bus SJ04 or Rapid KL 540 and stop at Serdang Fire Station bus stop which is nearby the MRT Serdang Jaya station.

Bus Routes
Serdang Komuter station is a major bus hub.

References

External links

 Serdang KTM Komuter Station

Seremban Line
Railway stations in Selangor